Cladophorales are an order of green algae, in the class Ulvophyceae.

There is a plausible fossil example in the mid-Ordovician Winneshiek shale

References

External links 

 
Chlorophyta orders
Taxa named by Ernst Haeckel